The Symphony in E minor is the first symphony written by the American composer Florence Price. The work was completed in 1932 and was first performed by the Chicago Symphony Orchestra under the conductor Frederick Stock in June 1933. The piece was Price's first full-scale orchestral composition and was the first symphony by a Black woman to be performed by a major American orchestra.

Composition
The symphony has a duration of roughly 40 minutes and is composed in four numbered movements.  

Allegro ma non troppo 
Largo, maestoso 
Juba Dance 
Finale

Background
The symphony was composed between January 1931 and early 1932 while Price recovered from a broken foot. In February 1932, Price entered the symphony in the Rodman Wanamaker Competition, in addition to three other concert works that she composed. While all of Price's entries received recognition, her Symphony in E minor won the first place $500 prize for an orchestral work. The award brought Price national recognition and caught the attention of the conductor Frederick Stock of the Chicago Symphony Orchestra. Stock later premiered the symphony with the Chicago Symphony Orchestra in June 1933.

Price drew inspiration from the third sentence entitled Juba from the juba dance: "African drums echo the patting, slapping rhythms as the strings play an upbeat melody" and from Antonín Dvořák's Symphony No. 9 in E minor, From the New World.

Instrumentation
The work is scored for an orchestra comprising two flutes, two piccolos, two oboes, two clarinets, two bassoons, four horns, two trumpets, three trombones, tuba, timpani, percussion, and strings.

Reception
The initial critical response to the symphony was positive, though the work has since fallen into relative obscurity. In 2012, Bob McQuiston of NPR called it "an early American symphony worthy of being rediscovered." He further remarked:

See also
Symphony No. 3 (Price)
Symphony No. 4 (Price)

References

External links 
 

1
1932 compositions
Compositions in E minor